George Adams (born May 15, 1949) is a retired American basketball player.

Born in Kings Mountain, North Carolina, he played collegiately for Gardner–Webb University in Boiling Springs, North Carolina.

Adams was selected by the Milwaukee Bucks in the third round (46th overall pick) of the 1972 NBA draft. He played in the ABA for the San Diego Conquistadors from 1972 to 1975. He was the first athlete to be inducted into Gardner–Webb University Hall of Fame. On April 27, 2009 he was inducted into the Cleveland County Hall of Fame.

ABA career statistics

Regular season

|-
| style="text-align:left;"| 
| style="text-align:left;"| San Diego
| 60 || – || 14.4 || .490 || .286 || .783 || 3.4 || 1.1 || – || – || 6.2
|-
| style="text-align:left;"| 
| style="text-align:left;"| San Diego
| 80 || – || 17.9 || .500 || .143 || .757 || 4.3 || 1.6 || .6 || .3 || 7.3
|-
| style="text-align:left;"| 
| style="text-align:left;"| San Diego
| 75 || – || 21.4 || .498 || .333 || .849 || 4.4 || 1.7 || .6 || .5 || 9.3
|- class="sortbottom"
| style="text-align:left;"| Career
| style="text-align:left;"|
| 215 || – || 18.2 || .497 || .235 || .794 || 4.1 || 1.5 || .6 || .4 || 7.7

References

1949 births
Living people
American men's basketball players
Basketball players from North Carolina
Gardner–Webb Runnin' Bulldogs men's basketball players
Milwaukee Bucks draft picks
People from Kings Mountain, North Carolina
San Diego Conquistadors players
Forwards (basketball)
Guards (basketball)